The following is a list of Green Bay Phoenix men's basketball head coaches. There have been 10 head coaches of the Phoenix in their 54-season history.

Green Bay's current head coach is Sundance Wicks. He was hired as the Phoenix's head coach in March 2023, replacing Freddie Owens, who was not retained as interim coach after the 2022–23 season.

References

Green Bay

Green Bay Phoenix basketball, men's, coaches